Presidential elections were held in Chile in 1871. Carried out through a system of electors, they resulted in the election of Federico Errázuriz Zañartu as President.

Results

References

Presidential elections in Chile
Chile
Election and referendum articles with incomplete results